Stanislav Frantsevich Redens (May 17, 1892 – January 21, 1940) was a Soviet NKVD official, one of those responsible for conducting mass repressions under Joseph Stalin. Redens was himself executed in 1940, after being arrested at the end of the Great Purge in 1938.

Early life 
Born to a Polish worker’s family in Tykocin in the Łomża Governorate of the Russian Empire, Redens received a limited education and began working in metallurgy in 1907. A Bolshevik since 1914, he was briefly mobilized into the army during World War I but was soon demobilized and returned to political activity in time for the 1917 Russian Revolution.

Career 
Redens began to work for the newly established Cheka in 1918, amid the Russian Civil War. He was energetically involved in dekulakization in Ukraine, serving as the head of the Odessa Cheka. Redens held important positions in the Crimean GPU in 1922-1923. 
Though made a chief of the Transcaucasian GPU in 1928, Redens was gradually sidelined by his own deputy Lavrenty Beria. In 1931, he was appointed the OGPU head in the Byelorussian SSR and then in the Ukrainian SSR. During his tenure in Ukraine, Redens gained fame for crackdown on farmers, which contributed to the Holodomor, the starvation of millions of Ukrainians as part of a larger famine across the Soviet Union. In January 1933, he was recalled to Moscow and placed in charge of the NKVD units in the Moscow Oblast where Redens spearheaded purges following Sergey Kirov assassination in 1934. 
 
Redens was elected to the Supreme Soviet of the Soviet Union in 1937 and appointed as People's Commissar for Internal Affairs of the Kazakh Soviet Socialist Republic in 1938. He was arrested on charges of being a member of “Polish subversive-spying group” in November 1938 and shot in January 1940. He was rehabilitated under Nikita Khrushchev in 1961.

Personal life 
Redens was married to Anna Sergeyevna Alliluyeva (1896–1964), sister of Stalin’s second wife Nadezhda Alliluyeva, also an Old Bolshevik and former Cheka officer who spent 6 years in prison under Stalin. Their son, Vladimir Alliluyev (Redens) (born 1935), published, in 1995, his memoirs "Chronicle of a Family" which advocated Russia's return to Stalinism and was condemned by Stalin’s daughter Svetlana Alliluyeva.

References 

1892 births
1940 deaths
People from Tykocin
People from Łomża Governorate
Soviet people of Polish descent
Russian Social Democratic Labour Party members
Old Bolsheviks
First convocation members of the Soviet of the Union
People's commissars and ministers of the Kazakh Soviet Socialist Republic
Republican Cheka (Ukraine) chairmen
Commissars 1st Class of State Security
Cheka
NKVD officers
NKVD troika
Holodomor
Great Purge perpetrators
Russian military personnel of World War I
Great Purge victims from Poland
Polish people executed by the Soviet Union
Executed people from Podlaskie Voivodeship
Soviet rehabilitations